Evdokiya Petrovna Rostopchina (December 23, 1811 – December 3, 1858) was one of the early Russian women poets.

Biography
After losing her mother at the age of six, Evdokiya Sushkova grew up in Moscow in the family of her maternal grandfather, Ivan Alexandrovich Pashkov. The young girl was very fond of reading and quickly learned German, French, Italian and English.

In 1831 her friend Pyotr Vyazemsky published her first poem, "Talisman", in his almanac "Severnye Tsvety" (Northern Flowers). In 1833 she married count Andrey Fedorovich Rostopchin, a rich son of the former Moscow commander-in-chief, Fyodor Rostopchin.

In 1836 the family moved to Petersburg, where the countess was well received in the high intellectual society of the capital. Her literary work was supported by such poets as Lermontov, Pushkin, Zhukovsky. Ogarev, Mey, and Tyutchev devoted their poems to her. Her popular literary salon hosted such famous guests of its literary salon were Vyazemsky, Gogol, Myatlev, Pletnev, and others.

Poems about the unrequited love comprised a large part of her poetry. In 1839 she published a book "Descriptions of High Society", which was ignored both by the readers and by critics. Although Rostopchina also wrote prose and comedy, these works did not enjoy any particular success.

During her trip abroad in 1845 the poet wrote an allegorical ballad named "Forced Marriage", in which she condemned Russia's relationship with Poland. On the orders of enraged Nicholas I, Rostopchina was forbidden to appear in the capital; and till the death of the tsar she lived in Moscow.

Rostopchina continued to write poems, plays, and translations, but public interest in her work already decreased. In the last years of her life, she ridiculed various literary movements in Russia; as the result, she found herself in complete isolation.

Almost forgotten by the public and succumbing after two years of sickness, Rostopchina died on December 3, 1858.

References

Poets from the Russian Empire
1811 births
1858 deaths
Salon holders from the Russian Empire
Nobility from the Russian Empire
Women writers from the Russian Empire
Women poets from the Russian Empire